The Woodland Heights neighborhood is one of the oldest and most historic in Houston, Texas. It encompasses approximately 2000 homes in the 77009 ZIP code and is bounded on the north by Pecore Street, on the west by Studewood Street, on the east by I-45, and on the south by I-10.

When platted in 1907 by William A. Wilson, the neighborhood was a 20-minute streetcar ride north of downtown via Houston Avenue. Although originally designed as an independent streetcar suburb, it was eventually incorporated into the city of Houston and is now one of the closest residential neighborhoods to downtown (aside from the much smaller Sixth Ward).

Nestled as it is in the crook of two major Interstate highways, it is often overlooked or is assumed to be part of the much larger and somewhat older Houston Heights neighborhood to its west. (Studewood Street is the dividing line between the two neighborhoods.) However, if one knows what to look for, it becomes apparent that the architecture of the Woodland Heights is somewhat distinct from that of the Houston Heights. The Houston Heights was platted in 1891, while the Woodland Heights was platted more than 15 years later. During that period, American architecture had undergone a transition from the larger and more ornate Victorian-style homes of the late 19th century to the smaller, simpler and more modest bungalow style of the early 20th century Arts and Crafts era, and the two neighborhoods reflect this shift. In fact, its architecture is much closer to that of the Norhill neighborhood to its north and the Eastwood neighborhood on the east side of downtown (which was also platted by William A. Wilson in 1911 as a somewhat more upscale counterpart to his Woodland Heights development).

Both the upscale Houston Heights and Eastwood neighborhoods suffered a slow decline following World War II, followed by a gradual recovery at the end of the 20th century. The Woodland Heights' and Norhill's more modest, working class bungalows, however, largely escaped this process, and are now among the most desirable neighborhoods in the city (along with the largely restored Houston Heights and revived Eastwood neighborhoods).

Although the Woodland Heights continues to undergo a gradual gentrification process, it still retains a great deal of quirky charm. It features large, mature trees and many outstanding gardens, both flower and vegetable (some large enough to be bordering on small-scale farming operations). The neighborhood has at least one resident beekeeper, and in many places it still has no proper gutters, but instead relies on open drainage ditches (with choruses of frogs most summer evenings).

On June 29, 2011, Houston’s City Council voted to approve the residents’ historic designation application thereby making a small portion of the original lands a historic district.  Woodland Heights Historic District covers about 386 homes and contains the neighborhoods' variety of architectural styles including Queen Anne, bungalow, American Craftsman, late Victorian cottages, American Four square, and English Cottage.

The main route into the neighborhood, Studewood Street, is a three-lane reversible road, in which the middle lane is dedicated to southbound traffic (toward downtown) during the morning rush hour, and northbound traffic (into the neighborhood) during the evening rush hour. It is one of only a few such streets in Houston. The Woodland Heights is home to Lights In the Heights, where most homes are decorated with Christmas lights and various performances can be found around the neighborhood.

The walking paths, baseball fields, and public swimming pool along White Oak Bayou, which runs along the neighborhood's southern border, provide views of the Downtown Houston skyline. The White Oak Bayou watershed is a notable floodplain, where the bayou has overflowed its banks in 1992, 1998 (from Tropical Storm Frances), and in 2001 during Tropical Storm Allison.

The neighborhood was one of the earliest in the United States to be linked together via a community email list, and its active civic association sponsors an annual "Lights in the Heights" celebration each December, in which 14 blocks of two parallel streets are lit by luminaria and closed to motor vehicles. The celebration features hot beverages, live music and carriage rides, and attracts visitors from all across the city.  The 2006 Lights in the Heights featured an illuminated parade, with several art cars in the lineup.

Government and infrastructure
The Woodland Heights is a part of Houston City Council District H.

The Houston Police Department's Central Patrol Division  serves the neighborhood. The area is also patrolled by Harris County Constable Precinct One Deputies.

Harris Health System (formerly Harris County Hospital District) designated Casa de Amigos Health Center in Northside for the ZIP code 77009. The nearest public hospital is Ben Taub General Hospital in the Texas Medical Center.

Education

Primary and secondary schools

Public schools

Woodland Heights is served by the Houston Independent School District, and is home to Travis Elementary School, which resides on Block 5. Woodland Heights is also zoned to Hogg Middle School, in adjacent Norhill, and Heights High School (formerly Reagan High School), in the Houston Heights.

Travis Elementary was first built in 1908, with a new campus built in 1926. It received an addition in 1970s, and that was scheduled to be replaced with a new building as part of the 2002 HISD Bond. The renovation of the 1926 section and construction of the new facility was scheduled for completion in 2006.

Private schools
Houston Outdoor Learning Academy is a private 6-12 school that integrates academics with hands on outdoor learning and international travel and is located at the edge of Woodland Heights.

Community colleges
Residents are within the zone of the Houston Community College System.

Parks and recreation
The Woodland Park and Community Center, operated by the City of Houston, has an outdoor basketball pavilion, an indoor gymnasium, a lighted sports field, and a lighted tennis court.

Notable residents
 William Goyen (novelist)
 Rosie Walker, publisher of Houston Downtown and a minor candidate for the 1989 election of the Mayor of Houston

See also
 First Ward, Houston
 Eastwood, Houston

References

External links
 Woodland Heights Civic Association
 Woodland Heights Historic District

Neighborhoods in Houston
Streetcar suburbs